Cafayate is a town located at the central zone of the Valles Calchaquíes in the province of Salta, Argentina.
It has about 12,000 inhabitants.

The town is an important tourist centre for exploring the Calchaquíes valleys, and because of the quality and originality of the wines produced in the area. The town was founded in 1840 by Manuel Fernando de Aramburu, at the site of a mission. In 1863 the Cafayate Department was created, of which Cafayate is the capital.

Etymology
The Cafayates were a tribe of the Diaguita-Calchaquí group, which, together with the related Tolombón, inhabited the Valles Calchaquíes prior to the arrival of the Spanish Conquistadores. Their language was known as Cacán. Like other Diaguita tribes, they had recently fallen under the influence of the Incas, after a prolonged resistance. They later mounted a fierce resistance to the Spaniards.

Even though most agree that the root of Cafayate is Quechua, the meaning of the term is disputed. Some claim it to mean "Box of Water", others to be a deformation of Capac-Yac ("Great Lake") or  Capac-Yaco ("Great Chief" or "Wealthy People"). Another Cacán version understands it as "Grave of Sorrows".

Wines

The wine production is most important in the Valles Calchaquíes.
The wines produced in the region benefit from the low-humidity mild weather of the valleys that receive an average of less than 250 mm of precipitation per year.
The most characteristic type of wine cultivated in the area is torrontés. Most wine-cellars around the town host free guided tours.

Valles Calchaquíes
Many of the most impressive sights in the Valley of the Río las Conchas (Quebrada de Cafayate) are along the paved, 183-kilometres-long National Route 68 that goes from Salta to Cafayate. National Route 40 goes for 165 kilometres from Cafayate to Cachi, another of the most visited points in the area (please note that this stretch of RN40 is not paved and should be avoided during the raining season). Other points of interest from Cafayate include Molinos, Tolombón and San Isidro ranch. The town of Cafayate is an attraction by itself, with its laid-back rhythm, colonial style, and wine cellars open to the public.

References

External links

 Official site

 Salta Tourism
 Tourism 
 Description
 Map of the town, and other info
 North of Argentina Tourist info 
 Cafayate, Argentina Tourist info
 Gallery of Cafayate at night

Populated places in Salta Province
Populated places established in 1640
Wine regions of Argentina
1640 establishments in the Spanish Empire
Cities in Argentina
Argentina
Salta Province